Sumay-ye Jonubi Rural District is in Sumay-ye Beradust District of Urmia County, West Azerbaijan province, Iran. At the National Census of 2006, its population was 13,915 in 2,258 households. There were 13,075 inhabitants in 2,685 households at the following census of 2011. At the most recent census of 2016, the population of the rural district was 12,452 in 2,649 households. The largest of its 24 villages was Hovarsin, with 1,328 people.

References 

Urmia County

Rural Districts of West Azerbaijan Province

Populated places in West Azerbaijan Province

Populated places in Urmia County